Derrick Allen Mahorn (born September 21, 1958) is an American former professional basketball player who played power forward and center for the Washington Bullets, Detroit Pistons, Philadelphia 76ers, and the New Jersey Nets of the National Basketball Association (NBA). He is currently a radio analyst for the Detroit Pistons, works as a co-host/analyst on SiriusXM NBA Radio, and during the summer is the head coach of the Aliens of the BIG3.

Mahorn had a reputation for physical play, and was a member of the late 1980s Detroit Pistons teams known as "The Bad Boys", and with them won the 1989 NBA Championship.  
After his playing career, Mahorn would go on to be an assistant coach under Pistons teammate and head coach Bill Laimbeer with the Detroit Shock of the Women's National Basketball Association (WNBA) and was part of two WNBA Championship teams (2006, 2008).  He would eventually become head coach of the Shock, and later became head coach of Trilogy of the BIG3, leading the team to the inaugural BIG3 Championship in 2017, making Mahorn the only one in history to have won a championship in the NBA, WNBA, and BIG3.

College career
Mahorn played college basketball at Hampton University. He was a three-time NAIA All-American and owned 18 school records. He scored 2,418 points while playing for the Pirates, averaging 20.3 points per game.

Playing career
The turning point of Mahorn's career was perhaps when he was traded by the Washington Bullets to the Detroit Pistons. He was unhappy with the trade initially and, as he claimed in a 2014 ESPN documentary, showed up to training camp overweight and out of shape. After teammate Bill Laimbeer took him aside and spoke with him about what he was brought there for, Mahorn acquiesced and became an integral part of the Pistons’ core. In 1989, Mahorn - dubbed by Piston announcer George Blaha the "Baddest Bad Boy of them all" - won his only NBA championship with the Pistons.

Two days after the Pistons won the championship in 1989, the NBA held an expansion draft for its two newest franchises, the Orlando Magic and Minnesota Timberwolves. League rules dictated that only eight players on each roster could be protected from being drafted by either team, and the Pistons elected not to extend that protection to Mahorn. As such, he was made the second pick in the expansion draft and the first to be taken by the Timberwolves; the Pistons were conducting their victory celebration in Detroit while the draft was happening and Mahorn was taken aside during the festivities so he could be told. Pistons general manager Jack McCloskey tried to reacquire Mahorn to no avail, and years later Mahorn was shown to still be bothered by what transpired as the story of the expansion draft brought him to tears during the 2014 ESPN film about the team.

Mahorn, as it turned out, would never play for Minnesota. After refusing to report to the Timberwolves, he ended up being traded instead to the Philadelphia 76ers, where he teamed with superstar Charles Barkley (despite previous rivalries with him) to form the top-rebounding duo of "Thump N' Bump." After two seasons, Mahorn moved to the Italian Serie A for the 1991–92 season.

Mahorn later played for the New Jersey Nets for four seasons, before returning to the Pistons in 1996–97 under coach Doug Collins. He retired after the 1999 season, after a second stint with the 76ers.

Coaching

WNBA
Mahorn then served as a color commentator for Pistons radio broadcasts, and as an assistant coach under former teammate Bill Laimbeer with the WNBA's Detroit Shock. Laimbeer and Mahorn led the Shock to two WNBA titles (2006, 2008).

On July 22, 2008, at a Sparks-Shock game, Mahorn attempted to break up a brawl. When attempting to restrain Lisa Leslie, he put his left hand out and Leslie fell to the ground. Mahorn was suspended for two games.

On June 15, 2009, he became the head coach of the Shock, a position he held until the franchise moved to Tulsa, Oklahoma after the season. Shortly afterward, Mahorn continued his work with Pistons radio, doing color commentary alongside Mark Champion.

BIG3
In 2017, Mahorn became head coach of Trilogy, the eventual champion of the BIG3 basketball league's inaugural season. His team's players included Al Harrington and Kenyon Martin.

NBA career statistics

Regular season

|-
| style="text-align:left;"| 
| style="text-align:left;"| Washington
| 52 || 0 || 13.4 || .507 || .000 || .675 || 4.1 || 0.5 || 0.4 || .8 || 4.8
|-
| style="text-align:left;"| 
| style="text-align:left;"| Washington
| 80 || 80 || 33.3 || .507 || .000 || .632 || 8.8 || 1.9 || 0.7 || 1.7 || 12.2
|-
| style="text-align:left;"| 
| style="text-align:left;"| Washington
| 82 || 82 || 36.9 || .490 || .000 || .575 || 9.5 || 1.4 || 1.0 || 1.8 || 11.0
|-
| style="text-align:left;"| 
| style="text-align:left;"| Washington
| 82 || 82 || 32.9 || .507 || .000  || .651 || 9.0 || 1.6 || 0.8 || 1.5 || 9.0
|-
| style="text-align:left;"| 
| style="text-align:left;"| Washington
| 77 || 63 || 26.9 || .499 || .000 || .653 || 7.9 || 1.6 || 0.8 || 1.4 || 6.3
|-
| style="text-align:left;"| 
| style="text-align:left;"| Detroit
| 80 || 12 || 18.0 || .455 || .000 || .681 || 5.2 || 0.8 || 0.5 || .8 || 4.9
|-
| style="text-align:left;"| 
| style="text-align:left;"| Detroit
| 63 || 6 || 20.3 || .477 || .000 || .821 || 6.0 || 0.6 || 0.5 || .8 || 6.1
|-
| style="text-align:left;"| 
| style="text-align:left;"| Detroit
| 67 || 64 || 29.3 || .574 || .500 || .756 || 8.4 || 0.9 || 0.6 || .6 || 10.7
|-
| style="text-align:left;background:#afe6ba;"| †
| style="text-align:left;"| Detroit
| 72 || 61 || 24.9 || .517 || .000 || .748 || 6.9 || 0.8 || 0.6 || .9 || 7.3
|-
| style="text-align:left;"| 
| style="text-align:left;"| Philadelphia
| 75 || 66 || 30.3 || .497 || .222 || .715 || 7.6 || 1.3 || 0.6 || 1.4 || 10.8
|-
| style="text-align:left;"| 
| style="text-align:left;"| Philadelphia
| 80 || 74 || 30.5 || .467 || .000 || .788 || 7.8 || 1.5 || 1.0 || .7 || 8.9
|-
| style="text-align:left;"| 
| style="text-align:left;"| New Jersey
| 74 || 9 || 14.6 || .472 || .333 || .800 || 3.8 || 0.4 || 0.3 || .4 || 3.9
|-
| style="text-align:left;"| 
| style="text-align:left;"| New Jersey
| 28 || 0 || 8.1 || .489 || .000 || .650 || 1.9 || 0.2 || 0.1 || .2 || 2.1
|-
| style="text-align:left;"| 
| style="text-align:left;"| New Jersey
| 58 || 7 || 10.9 || .523 || .333 || .796 || 2.8 || 0.4 || 0.2 || .2 || 3.4
|-
| style="text-align:left;"| 
| style="text-align:left;"| New Jersey
| 50 || 0 || 9.0 || .352 || .000 || .723 || 2.2 || 0.3 || 0.3 || .3 || 2.4
|-
| style="text-align:left;"| 
| style="text-align:left;"| Detroit
| 22 || 7 || 9.9 || .370 || .000 || .727 || 2.4 || 0.3 || 0.2 || .1 || 2.5
|-
| style="text-align:left;"| 
| style="text-align:left;"| Detroit
| 59 || 0 || 12.0 || .457 || .000 || .676 || 3.3 || 0.3 || 0.2 || .1 || 2.4
|-
| style="text-align:left;"| 
| style="text-align:left;"| Philadelphia
| 16 || 0 || 7.9 || .278 || .000 || .375 || 1.4 || 0.1 || 0.3 || .1 || 0.8
|-class="sortbottom"
| style="text-align:center;" colspan="2" | Career
| 1117 || 613 || 23.1 || .493 || .132 || .704 || 6.2 || 1.0 || 0.6 || .9 || 6.9

Playoffs

|-
| style="text-align:left;"| 1982
| style="text-align:left;"| Washington
| 7 || 7 || 34.6 || .438 || .000 || .714 || 8.7 || 1.9 || 1.4 || .7 || 10.6
|-
| style="text-align:left;"| 1984
| style="text-align:left;"| Washington
| 4 || 4 || 38.5 || .600 || .000 || .800 || 10.8 || 1.5 || 0.3 || 1.5 || 9.5
|-
| style="text-align:left;"| 1985
| style="text-align:left;"| Washington
| 4 || 1 || 10.3 || .500 || .000 || 1.000 || 1.8 || 0.0 || 0.0 || .8 || 3.0
|-
| style="text-align:left;"| 1986
| style="text-align:left;"| Detroit
| 4 || 0 || 15.3 || .385 || .000 || 1.000 || 3.0 || 0.0 || 0.3 || .0 || 3.0
|-
| style="text-align:left;"| 1987
| style="text-align:left;"| Detroit
| 15 || 15 || 32.2 || .541 || .000 || .800 || 9.5 || 0.3 || 0.4 || .7 || 9.7
|-
| style="text-align:left;"| 1988
| style="text-align:left;"| Detroit
| 23 || 21 || 17.8 || .344 || .000 || .684 || 3.9 || 0.6 || 0.2 || .4 || 3.3
|-
| style="text-align:left;background:#afe6ba;"| 1989†
| style="text-align:left;"| Detroit
| 17 || 17 || 21.2 || .580 || .000 || .654 || 5.1 || 0.4 || 0.5 || .8 || 5.7
|-
| style="text-align:left;"| 1990
| style="text-align:left;"| Philadelphia
| 10 || 10 || 34.2 || .430 || .000 || .769 || 7.0 || 1.0 || 0.7 || .8 || 9.4
|-
| style="text-align:left;"| 1991
| style="text-align:left;"| Philadelphia
| 8 || 8 || 26.0 || .556 || .000 || .786 || 5.3 || 1.8 || 0.3 || .5 || 6.4
|-
| style="text-align:left;"| 1993
| style="text-align:left;"| New Jersey
| 4 || 2 || 15.8 || .400 || .000 || .000 || 3.3 || 0.8 || 0.0 || .5 || 2.0
|-
| style="text-align:left;"| 1994
| style="text-align:left;"| New Jersey
| 3 || 0 || 6.3 || .000 || .000 || .000 || 1.3 || 0.0 || 0.0 || .3 || 0.0
|-
| style="text-align:left;"| 1997
| style="text-align:left;"| Detroit
| 2 || 1 || 9.0 || .000 || .000 || .000 || 0.5 || 0.0 || 0.0 || .0 || 0.0
|-
| style="text-align:left;"| 1999
| style="text-align:left;"| Philadelphia
| 5 || 0 || 5.8 || .333 || .000 || .500 || 1.6 || 0.2 || 0.2 || .0 || 1.6
|-class="sortbottom"
| style="text-align:center;" colspan="2" | Career
| 106 || 86 || 22.9 || .427 || .000 || .750 || 5.5 || 0.7 || 0.4 || .6 || 5.8

Personal life 
Mahorn played himself in a 2017 episode of Detroiters titled "Quick Rick Mahorn of Dearborn."

Awards and honors
1989 NBA Champion (as a player with the Detroit Pistons)
Two-time WNBA Champion (2006, 2008 - as an assistant coach with the Detroit Shock)
2017 BIG3 Champion (as head coach of Trilogy)
Virginia Sports Hall of Fame (class of 2018)

References

External links

WNBA.com profile

1958 births
Living people
African-American basketball coaches
African-American basketball players
American expatriate basketball people in Italy
American men's basketball players
Basketball coaches from Connecticut
Basketball players from Hartford, Connecticut
Big3 coaches
Continental Basketball Association coaches
Detroit Pistons announcers
Detroit Pistons players
Detroit Shock coaches
Detroit Shock head coaches
Hampton Pirates men's basketball players
Minnesota Timberwolves expansion draft picks
New Jersey Nets players
Pallacanestro Virtus Roma players
Philadelphia 76ers players
Power forwards (basketball)
Sportspeople from Hartford, Connecticut
Washington Bullets draft picks
Washington Bullets players
21st-century African-American people
20th-century African-American sportspeople